Charles Weill Rackoff is an American cryptologist. Born and raised in New York City, he attended MIT as both an undergraduate and graduate student, and earned a Ph.D. degree in Computer Science in 1974.  He spent a year as a postdoctoral scholar at INRIA in France.

Rackoff currently works at the University of Toronto. His research interests are in computational complexity theory. For some time now he has been specializing in cryptography and security protocols. In 1988, he collaborated with Michael Luby in a widely cited analysis of the Feistel cipher construction (one important result shown there is the construction of a strongly pseudo random permutation generator from a pseudo random function generator). Rackoff was awarded the 1993 Gödel Prize for his work on interactive proof systems and for being one of the co-inventors of zero-knowledge proofs. In 2011 he won the RSA Award for Excellence in Mathematics for his various contributions to cryptography.

Rackoff's controversial comments on the 2000 memorial for the victims of the Montreal Massacre were reported in the Canadian media.

Selected publications
 S. Goldwasser, S. Micali and C. Rackoff, "The knowledge complexity of interactive proof systems", SIAM Journal on Computing, 18, 1989, pp. 186–208.
 C. Rackoff and D. Simon, "Non-interactive zero-knowledge proof of knowledge and the chosen cipertext attack", in Proceedings of Crypto 91, pp. 433–444.
 C. Rackoff and D. Simon, "Cryptographic defense against traffic analysis", in Proceedings of the 25th ACM Symposium on Theory of Computing, May 1993, pp. 672–681.

References 

Living people
1948 births
Scientists from New York City
American computer scientists
American cryptographers
Modern cryptographers
Gödel Prize laureates
MIT School of Engineering alumni
Academic staff of the University of Toronto
International Association for Cryptologic Research fellows
Mathematicians from New York (state)